The State Security Service of the Republic of Azerbaijan is a government agency established on the base of Ministry of National Security of Azerbaijan. State Security Service of the Republic of Azerbaijan was established by Decree 706 of President Ilham Aliyev, dated December 14, 2015 on the base of Ministry of National Security of Azerbaijan. Its incumbent Chairman is Ali Naghiyev

Legal basis 

The legal basis of the activities of the State Security Service contains the Constitution of the Republic of Azerbaijan, the laws and legislative acts of the Republic of Azerbaijan: “Intelligence and counterintelligence activities”, “On national security”, “On the fight against terrorism”, “On operational-investigative activities”, “On state secret” and others, the statute of State Security Service of the Republic of Azerbaijan, decrees and orders of the President of the Republic of Azerbaijan, resolutions and Orders of the Cabinet of Ministers of the Republic of Azerbaijan, central executive bodies` normative legal acts adopted following legislation, international agreements signed by the Republic of Azerbaijan following the laws of the Republic of Azerbaijan.
State Security Service operates following commitments of observing the human and civil rights and freedom, humanism, the principle of responsibility for the state and society.

Lineage 

 Organization to Fight against Counter-Revolution (1918-1920)
 Extraordinary Commissions of the Cheka (1920-1921)
 State Political Department (1922-1934)
 Main State Security Department (SSSD) of People's Commissariat of Internal Affairs (1934-1945)
 Ministry of State Security (1945-1959)

 Committee for State Security of the Azerbaijani Soviet Socialist Republic (1959-1991)
 Ministry of National Security (1991-2015)
 State Security Service (2015-present)

Structure 
 Academy of the State Security Service named after Heydar Aliyev
 Medical Center 
 International Anti-Terror Training Center
 Cultural Center

Academy 
The Academy of the State Security Service was established in the basis of decree of president of Azerbaijan dated December 1, 1998. The main goal of the Academy is to train highly qualified personnel for national security agencies.
The academy has 3 faculties:
 Faculty of Border Troops
 Faculty of Training of Operational Workers
 Faculty of Retraining and Advanced Training

Medical Center 
The Main Military Medical Department of the State Security Service was inaugurated on 12 November 2013, providing sanatorium-resort treatment and recreation for the SSS military personnel and retirees and their families. It is located at 1 Maktabli Street in the municipality of Badamdar in the Sabail District. The polyclinic of the Main Military Medical Department  carries out initial examinations and outpatient treatment of military servicemen, retirees and their families.

Cultural Center 
The building where the Cultural Center of the State Security Service is located at the site of a church designed by the famous Polish architect Jozef Ploszko in 1909-1912, which was demolished under Bolshevik rule in 1931. In the 1930s, a decision was made to establish a cultural club in Baku for the security bodies known as the Dzerzhinsky Club. It was under construction from 1938-39, although construction work was halted due to World War II. In 1947, the construction of the building was completed by the State Design Institute. Party congresses and anniversary ceremonies of the KGB were held in the building in the Soviet era. On 31 January 2008, the building was handed over to the State Security Service and the official opening of the building after major overhaul was held on 14 March 2009. The Cultural Center has a concert hall for 600 people, a small hall for 100 people, a conference hall and a restaurant for 120 people.

See also
 Cabinet of Azerbaijan

References

External links

Azeri intelligence agencies
Counterintelligence agencies
2015 establishments in Azerbaijan
Government agencies established in 2015
Azerbaijan